The Politburo of the 24th Congress of the Communist Party of the Soviet Union was in session from 1971 to 1976.

Composition

Members

Candidates

References

Politburo of the Central Committee of the Communist Party of the Soviet Union members
Politburo
Politburo
Politburo
Politburo
Politburo
Politburo
Politburo
Politburo
Politburo